The 1919 Oglethorpe Stormy Petrels football team represented Oglethorpe University in the sport of American football during the 1919 college football season.

Game summaries

Games were won and lost by a nose with the forward pass being a constant struggle for the Stormy Petrels. The season, despite heavy losses, put Oglethorpe on the map through their athletic prowess and gentlemanly conduct, which set Oglethorpe up for membership in the Southern Intercollegiate Athletic Association (SIAA) after the following year, and the difficult schedule also prepared them for their tough opponents in years to come. The season was especially tough due to the lack of home games. The closest game Oglethorpe played to home was at Mercer University. Throughout the season the team traveled over 3,000 miles, and played in Tennessee, Georgia, South Carolina, and Florida. Everett Strupper was the team's backfield coach.

Personnel
The season marked the third with Frank B. Anderson, who hired Kirby Malone as an assistant for the year. Cecil Lemon was the team captain.

Schedule

References

Oglethorpe
Oglethorpe Stormy Petrels football seasons
Oglethorpe Stormy Petrels football